The Nariño massacres were two massacres of indigenous Awá people in the Nariño Department of Colombia perpetrated by members of the rebel Revolutionary Armed Forces of Colombia (FARC) in February 2009. A total of 27 Awás were massacred, including women and young children.

First massacre
The first massacre occurred on February 4, 2009 when a FARC guerrilla group entered the village Tortugal. FARC accused the Awás of collaborating with the Armed Forces of Colombia. These accusations led to the torture and killing of seventeen Awás, eight of whom were killed with knives, according to a witness who managed to escape. The incident was denounced by Human Rights Watch and the Governor of the Nariño Department, Antonio Navarro Wolff.

Second massacre
The second massacre occurred a week later on February 11, when ten Awá were murdered in the Sandé shelter between Ricaurte and Guachavez, apparently because they failed to provide FARC with information about the Colombian forces operating in the area. In press releases, FARC stated that they support the indigenous, but not those who conspire against them. The National Army of Colombia only found one of the bodies. Although the Awá live in a protected area, this did not prevent armed groups from entering their territory.

References

Massacres in Colombia
Massacres committed by FARC
Mass murder in 2009
Massacres in 2009
2009 in Colombia